Al-Hamra' was a Palestinian Arab village in the Safad Subdistrict. It was depopulated during the 1947–1948 Civil War in Mandatory Palestine on May 1, 1948, by the Palmach's First Battalion of Operation Yiftach. It was located 24.5 km northeast of Safad, 1 km northwest of Wadi al-Dufayla.

History
During the  British Mandate for Palestine, Al-Hamra' was noted as a village in the Palestine index Gazetteer.

In 1944, Shamir was established about 2 km northeast of the village site.

References

Bibliography

External links
Welcome To al-Hamra'
al-Hamra (Safed), Zochrot
Al-Hamra', Villages of Palestine

Arab villages depopulated during the 1948 Arab–Israeli War
District of Safad